R-24 regional road is a Montenegrin roadway.

This road was reconstructed in 2015. Together with another reconstructed road in 2010, Kolašin-Jezerine, and with section Jezerine-Lubnice completed in 2021, it forms a new regional road that would serve as a connection between Kolašin and Berane, making this trip shorter by some 40 km.

History

In January 2016, the Ministry of Transport and Maritime Affairs published bylaw on categorisation of state roads. With new categorisation, R-24 regional road was created from municipal road.

Major intersections

References

R-24